Cox Green School is a secondary school with academy status in Berkshire, England.

History
Cox Green School was founded in 1967, and in 1973 was part of a reorganisation of education in Maidenhead.  Cox Green School is an 11-18 comprehensive. The school became an Academy on 1 December 2011.

Facts
The school currently holds Sportsmark Silver.

During the 2020 Spring School CENSUS, the school's student population was 1113 students. This was split into 616 for KS3, 343 for KS4 and 154 KS5 / Sixth Form pupils.

Location
Cox Green is a parish in the south-west of Maidenhead.  The area is residential with several green spaces.

References

External links
 Cox Green School Website

Educational institutions established in 1967
Secondary schools in the Royal Borough of Windsor and Maidenhead
1967 establishments in England
Academies in the Royal Borough of Windsor and Maidenhead